Froghanstown is a townland in County Westmeath, Ireland.

Froghanstown is one of 14 townlands of the civil parish of Multyfarnham in the barony of Corkaree in the Province of Leinster. 

The neighbouring townlands are: Tober to the north–east, Lismalady to the east, Multyfarnham to the south and Donore to the west.

In the 1911 census of Ireland there were 2 houses and 6 inhabitants in the townland.

References

External links
Map of Froghanstown at openstreetmap.org
Froghanstown at the IreAtlas Townland Data Base
Froghanstown at Townlands.ie
Froghanstown at The Placenames Database of Ireland

Townlands of County Westmeath